From the Soul of Man is the second studio album by American singer Kenny Lattimore. It was released by Columbia Records on September 8, 1998 in the United States.

Critical reception 

Critics uniformly lauded this album as a great leap from his debut on the scene two years prior to this largely mature effort. The album opens with the first single "Days Like This", an introspective midtempo R&B track with avant garde electronic inflections. "Days", along with 7 other tracks on the album were co-written by Lattimore. A highlight is Lattimore's faithful and yet individual cover of Donny Hathaway's "I Love You More Than You'll Ever Know", first heard on Hathaway's landmark Extension of a Man album. Lattimore also reimagines The Beatles' "While My Guitar Gently Weeps" as a soulful ballad that closes with a hypnotically layered arrangement of background vocals. "Who knew that 'While My Guitar Gently Weeps' could be so sexy?" remarks Michael Gallucci.

Chart performance 
In the United States, the album peaked at number 71 on the Billboard 200. On Billboard'''s Top R&B/Hip-Hop Albums chart, it reached number 15. The lead single "Days Like This" peaked at number 84 on the Hot R&B/Hip-Hop Singles & Tracks chart. Re-released with soulful "Nuyorican soul" house mixes, produced by Masters at Work, the track climbed to number 26 on the Hot Dance Music/Club Play chart. Second single "If I Lose My Woman" fared better on the Hot R&B/Hip-Hop Singles & Tracks chart, peaking at number 15. It also topped the Billboard'' Bubbling Under R&B/Hip-Hop Singles in early 1999 within 3 weeks of its appearance on the chart.

Track listing

Charts

References

External links 
 

1998 albums
Albums produced by Dre & Vidal
Albums produced by Walter Afanasieff
Albums produced by David Foster
Kenny Lattimore albums